Devane-MacQueen House is a historic home located near Grays Creek, Cumberland County, North Carolina. It was built about 1855, and is a two-story, five bay, Greek Revival style frame dwelling with a hipped roof. It has a double-pile central-hall plan. Also on the property are the contributing schoolhouse, chicken coop, smokehouse, two tobacco barns, and a two-story slave-turned-tenant house.

It was listed on the National Register of Historic Places in 1983.

References

Houses on the National Register of Historic Places in North Carolina
Greek Revival houses in North Carolina
Houses completed in 1855
Houses in Cumberland County, North Carolina
National Register of Historic Places in Cumberland County, North Carolina